Rhabdophis auriculatus, the white-lined water snake , is a keelback snake in the family Colubridae found in the Philippines.

References

Rhabdophis
Snakes of Southeast Asia
Reptiles of the Philippines
Endemic fauna of the Philippines
Reptiles described in 1858
Taxa named by Albert Günther